Out of the Blue is an American teen sitcom that ran in syndication from September 16, 1995 to February 1996. The series was filmed on location at SeaWorld in Orlando, Florida, and distributed by Tribune Entertainment.  It is notable in that each of its 22 episodes was filmed in both Spanish and English simultaneously and starred a predominantly Hispanic cast of several different nationalities.

The show was dubbed into German as Sommer Sonne Florida, and into Italian as Un salto nel blu, but was poorly distributed and largely unknown in Germany, Italy, the United States, or Latin America.

Among the show's young cast was Spanish fashion model Veronica Blume, whose budding real-life modeling career was occasionally incorporated into the show's storyline, and Paulo Benedeti, who would later play recurring roles on American soap operas.

Cast
Veronica Blume (Spanish) as Veronica
Paulo Benedeti (Colombian) as Max
Brooke Burns (American;  the show's only non-Hispanic) as Peg
Timothy Martinez (American) as Timmy
Carlos Conde as Charlie
Jose Capote as Jose
Maite Arnedo as Maria

Episodes

Stations

References

External links

Sommer Sonne Florida 
Sommer Sonne Florida (Google Translated in English) 
Un Salto nel blu  - includes cast photo
Out of the Blue Soundtrack
Out of the Blue (1995, USA)
Out of the Blue Episode Guide’’

1995 American television series debuts
1996 American television series endings
1990s American teen sitcoms
1990s American sitcoms
Television shows filmed in Florida
English-language television shows
First-run syndicated television programs in the United States
Spanish-language television programming in the United States
Television series by Tribune Entertainment
Television series about teenagers